was a Japanese samurai and naval commander of Mōri clan in the Sengoku period.
He was head of the Noshima Murakami pirates.

History
In 1555, "Noshima Murakami" navy helped the Mōri clan and played an important role during the Battle of Miyajima.

In 1561, Takeyoshi fought at the Siege of Moji against combined navy of the Ōtomo clan and Portuguese traders under Ōtomo Sōrin.

In 1576, during Ishiyama Hongan-ji War, Takeyoshi's eldest son, Motoyoshi, led the Murakami navy to defeat Oda Nobunaga`s navy in the first battle of Kizugawaguchi.

In 1578, Takeyoshi himself, however, was defeated by Kuki Yoshitaka's navy of Oda clan in the second battle of Kizugawaguchi because Kuki's navy used new iron ships (Tekkōsen) to repel the arrows and bullets.

See also
Kuki Yoshitaka
Ohama Kagetaka

Further reading
Murakami Kaizoku no Musume (村上海賊の娘, "The Murakami Pirate’s Daughter") vol.1~4 Ryō Wada- Shinchosha, 2013

References

Samurai
1533 births
1604 deaths
Mōri clan